Árpád Majoros (born 21 December 1983 in Szolnok) is a Hungarian football player who plays as a midfielder.

References

External links
 
 Profile 
 

1983 births
Living people
People from Szolnok
Hungarian footballers
Association football midfielders
Hungary international footballers
Vasas SC players
Zalaegerszegi TE players
MKS Cracovia (football) players
Nyíregyháza Spartacus FC players
Szigetszentmiklósi TK footballers
Békéscsaba 1912 Előre footballers
Nemzeti Bajnokság I players
Hungarian expatriate footballers
Expatriate footballers in Poland
Hungarian expatriate sportspeople in Poland
Nemzeti Bajnokság II players
Sportspeople from Jász-Nagykun-Szolnok County